Hemibarbus is a genus of cyprinid fish found in eastern Asia.  There are currently 12 recognized species in this genus.

Species
 Hemibarbus brevipennus P. Q. Yue, 1995
 Hemibarbus labeo (Pallas, 1776) (Barbel steed)
 Hemibarbus lehoai V. H. Nguyễn, 2001
 Hemibarbus longirostris (Regan, 1908)
 Hemibarbus macracanthus Y. L. Lu, P. Q. Luo & Yi-Yu Chen, 1977
 Hemibarbus maculatus Bleeker, 1871 (Spotted steed)
 Hemibarbus medius P. Q. Yue, 1995
 Hemibarbus mylodon (L. S. Berg, 1907)
 Hemibarbus qianjiangensis T. Yu, 1990
 Hemibarbus songloensis V. H. Nguyễn, 2001
 Hemibarbus thacmoensis V. H. Nguyễn, 2001
 Hemibarbus umbrifer (S. Y. Lin, 1931)
 Hemibarbus barbus (Temminck et Schlegel, 1846)

References